The Rivals of Sherlock Holmes is a British anthology mystery television series produced by Thames Television which was originally broadcast on the ITV Network. There were two series of 13 fifty-minute episodes; the first aired in 1971, the second in 1973. The programme presented adaptations of short mystery, suspense or crime stories featuring, as the title suggests, detectives who were literary contemporaries of Arthur Conan Doyle's Sherlock Holmes.

The Rivals of Sherlock Holmes took its inspiration – and title – from a series of published anthologies by Hugh Greene, younger brother of author Graham Greene and the former director-general of the BBC. Greene is credited on the programme as a creative consultant.

Recurring characters
 Douglas Wilmer as Augustus S. F. X. Van Dusen (2 episodes)
 Peter Vaughan as Horace Dorrington (2 episodes)
 Kenneth Colley as Farrish (2 episodes)
 Petronella Barker as Miss Parrot (2 episodes)
 Peter Barkworth as Martin Hewitt (2 episodes)
 Ronald Hines as Jonathan Pryde (2 episodes)

Episode list

Series 1 (20 Sep – 9 Dec 1971)

Series 2 (29 Jan – 7 May 1973)

DVD availability
The first series was released on a 4-disc Region 2 DVD set by Network Distributing on 15 June 2009.  Acorn Media released a Region 1 version of this set on 1 September 2009. Series Two was released on a Network DVD 4-disc Region 2 release on 15 February 2010; Acorn followed with a Region 1 version on 27 April.

Bibliography
 Greene, Hugh; editor.  The Rivals of Sherlock Holmes.  Pantheon Books, 1970; 
 Greene, Hugh; editor.  Cosmopolitan Crimes: Foreign Rivals of Sherlock Holmes.  Pantheon Books, 1971; 
 Greene, Hugh; editor.  Further Rivals of Sherlock Holmes.  Pantheon Books, 1973; 
 Greene, Hugh; editor.  The American Rivals of Sherlock Holmes.  Pantheon Books, 1976;

Notes

References

External links
 
 The Rivals of Sherlock Holmes at the BFI Film & TV database
 The Rivals of Sherlock Holmes at Television Heaven

1970s British anthology television series
1970s British crime television series
British detective television series
1971 British television series debuts
1973 British television series endings
1970s British drama television series
ITV mystery shows
English-language television shows
1970s British mystery television series
Television series based on short fiction